The Mulberry Home Economics Building is a historic school building in Mulberry, Arkansas.  It is a single-story stone and masonry structure, located off West 5th Street behind the current Mulberry High School building.  It has a rectangular plan, with a gable-on-hip roof and a projecting gable-roof entry pavilion on the north side near the western end.  The pavilion exhibits modest Craftsman styling, with exposed rafters in the roof and arched openings.  The south facade has a secondary entrance near the eastern end, and four irregularly sized and spaced window bays to its west.  The building was erected in 1939 with funding assistance from the National Youth Administration.

The building was listed on the National Register of Historic Places in 1992.

See also
National Register of Historic Places listings in Crawford County, Arkansas

References

School buildings on the National Register of Historic Places in Arkansas
National Register of Historic Places in Crawford County, Arkansas
National Youth Administration
Education in Crawford County, Arkansas
1939 establishments in Arkansas
School buildings completed in 1939
New Deal in Arkansas
Home economics education
American Craftsman architecture in Arkansas
Bungalow architecture in Arkansas